The episodes for the eighteenth season of the anime series Naruto: Shippuden are based on Part II for Masashi Kishimoto's manga series. The season continues the battle between the ninja alliance and Obito Uchiha. It also features two short anime only story arcs, one featuring Mecha Naruto from Naruto Shippuden: Ultimate Ninja Storm Revolution, and the other detailing Hinata and Hanabi's progress throughout the series. The episodes are directed by Hayato Date, and produced by Pierrot and TV Tokyo. The season aired from August to December 2014.

The season would make its English television debut on Adult Swim's Toonami programming block and premiere on January 30 to June 5, 2022.

The season contains four musical themes between two opening and two endings. The first opening theme,  by DOES, is used from episode 373 to 379. The second opening theme,  by KANA-BOON, is used from episode 380 to 393. The first ending theme, "Never Change" by SHUN and Lyu:Lyu is used from episode 373 to 379. The second ending theme,  by Shiori Tomita, is used from episode 380 to 393.


Episode list

Home releases

Japanese

English

References
General

Specific

2014 Japanese television seasons
Shippuden Season 18